Sind (sometimes called Scinde) was a province of British India from 1st April 1936 to 1947 and Dominion of Pakistan from 14 August 1947 to 14 October 1955.  Under the British, it encompassed the current territorial limits excluding the princely state of Khairpur. Its capital was Karachi. After Pakistan's creation, the province lost the city of Karachi, as it became the capital of the newly created country. It became part of West Pakistan upon the creation of the One Unit Scheme.

Administrative divisions
On 1st April 1936 Sind division was separated from Bombay Presidency and established as a province.

At that time the Province's Admistration division are listed below:

Location 

The province was bordered by Karachi (within the Federal Capital Territory after 1948) and the princely states of Las Bela and Kalat on the west.  To the north were the provinces of Baluchistan and West Punjab.  The province bordered the princely state of Bahawalpur on the northeast and it enclosed on three sides the princely state of Khairpur.  The Indian states of Rajasthan and Gujarat were beyond its borders to the east and south.  On the southwest lay the Arabian Sea, with the Sind's coastline consisting entirely of river deltas, including the Indus River Delta up to Sind's border with the city of Karachi, now the capital of present-day Sindh.

History 

Sindh was first settled by the Indus Valley civilization and Mohenjo-daro, as early as 1750 BC. It had Greek influence during its history after the expansion of the Macedonian Empire, and developed trade with surrounding regions. Several Sunni Muslim and Rajput kingdoms were set up there, beginning with the Rai Dynasty and ending with the Arghuns. The Mughal Empire conquered Sindh under the rule of Akbar in the year 1591. Soon after the coming of European companies, in particular the East India Company, the Mughal hold on the area loosened, and in 1843 Sindh became part of the British India and its Bombay Presidency. Soon, it became the Sind Province.

1936–1947 
On 1st April 1936, Sind was separated from Bombay Presidency to get the status of a province  and the provincial capital was settled in Karachi. Hyderabad division was formed on the place of Sind division.

1947–1955 
Following a resolution in the Sindh Legislative Assembly about joining Pakistan, with the independence and Partition of India in August 1947 Sindh became part of Pakistan. 

On 11 December 1954, the Sindh Legislative Assembly voted by 100 to 4 in favour of the One Unit policy announced by Prime Minister Chaudhry Mohammad Ali, and Sindh was merged into the new province of West Pakistan in 14 October 1955.

Demographics 
By the time of independence in 1947 Sindh had a Muslim majority for centuries but there were significant minorities of Hindus throughout the province. In 1947 due to communal tensions and partition two million Muslim refugees forced to flee to Pakistan while  most Hindus fled to India.

The refugees from India were mostly Urdu speakers, and although the official language of Sindh was Sindhi, many schools in big cities of Sindh transitioned to Urdu language education.

Government 

The offices of Governor of Sindh and Premier (later Chief Minister) of Sindh were established in 1936 when Sindh became a province. This system continued until 1955 when Sindh was dissolved.

Elections
 1937
 1946

References

See also 

 Sindh
 Khairpur
 Karachi

Former subdivisions of Pakistan
Provinces of British India

States and territories established in 1936
States and territories disestablished in 1955
1936 establishments in India